Sallah Shabati is a 1964 Israeli comedy film about the chaos of Israeli immigration and resettlement. This social satire placed the director Ephraim Kishon and producer Menahem Golan among the first Israeli filmmakers to achieve international success. It also introduced actor Chaim Topol (Fiddler on the Roof) to audiences worldwide.

The protagonist's name, Sallah Shabati, is perhaps a play on the phrase סליחה שבאתי, Sliḥa she'bati, "I apologise for coming". In earlier print versions of Kishon's short stories which were revised for the film, the character was known as Saadia Shabtai.

Plot
The film begins with Sallah Shabati, a Mizrahi Jewish immigrant, arriving in Israel by plane with his family: very pregnant wife, ancient female relative and seven children. Upon arrival he is taken to  live in a ma'abara, or transit camp, where he and his family are given a broken-down, one-room shack to live in.

The rest of the film follows Sallah's many attempts to earn enough money to purchase an apartment in a nearby new housing development. His money-making schemes are often comical and frequently satirize the political and social stereotypes in Israel at the time.

Finally realizing that people are more likely to get what they don't want, he organizes a demonstration against the housing office shouting the slogan: "We don't want the development: we want the ma'abara!" The film ends with residents being forcibly evicted by police and transported to the new housing complex.

Cast
 Topol as Sallah Shabati (as Haym Topol)
 Arik Einstein as Zigi, the kibbutznik boyfriend of Sallah's eldest daughter
 Geula Nuni as Habbubah Shabati (as Geula Noni), Sallah's daughter
 Gila Almagor as Batsheva Ha'Sosialit (social worker)
 Albert Cohen 
 Shraga Friedman as Neuman, the kibbutz secretary (administrator)
 Zaharira Harifai as Frieda, a kibbutz supervisor (and the real power)
 Shaike Levi as Shimon Shabati, Sallah's son
 Nathan Meisler as Mr. Goldstein, Sallah's neighbor and backgammon pal
 Esther Greenberg as Sallah's wife
 Mordecai Arnon as Mordecai

Themes
Sallah Shabati's irreverent and mocking depiction of core Zionist institutions like the kibbutz provoked strong reactions among many filmgoers and critics. "The kibbutzniks in the film resemble bureaucrats and are clearly divided into veterans with managing roles and 'simple' workers, a division which contradicts the myth of Socialist solidarity and collectivist idealism. The kibbutzniks betray total indifference, furthermore, to the miserable conditions of the poor ma'abara next to them."

Critical reception
Sallah Shabati received mixed reviews but achieved unprecedented box office success in Israel, drawing almost 1.3 million spectators.

New York Times critic A.H. Weiler called the film "more educational than hilarious", and said "Sallah Shabbati and his coterie are an unusual, endearing, often colorful lot, but their humor is largely rudimentary."

It won the Hollywood Foreign Press Association's Golden Globe Award as Best Foreign Film, and opened and closed the Berlin Film Festival. The film was nominated for a 1964 Academy Award in the category of Best Foreign Language Film, a first for an Israeli production, but it lost the Oscar to the Italian film, Yesterday, Today and Tomorrow.

The film won best actor (Haim Topol) and best screenplay (Ephraim Kishon) in the 1964 San Francisco International Film Festival.

See also
 List of submissions to the 37th Academy Awards for Best Foreign Language Film
 List of Israeli submissions for the Academy Award for Best Foreign Language Film
 Bourekas film

References

External links

Sallah Shabati, Israeli Movie Classics
 

1964 films
1964 comedy films
1960s satirical films
Films directed by Ephraim Kishon
1960s Hebrew-language films
Films about immigration
Films about the kibbutz
Israeli comedy films
Israeli satirical films
Films produced by Menahem Golan